The Arizona Diamondbacks (colloquially known as the D-backs) are an American professional baseball team based in Phoenix, Arizona. The Diamondbacks compete in Major League Baseball (MLB) as a member club of the National League (NL) West division. The franchise was established on March 9, 1995 and began play in 1998 as an expansion team. The team plays its home games at Chase Field, formerly known as Bank One Ballpark. Along with the Tampa Bay Rays, the Diamondbacks are one of the newest teams in MLB.

After a fifth-place finish in their inaugural season, the Diamondbacks made several off-season acquisitions, including future Hall of Fame pitcher Randy Johnson, who won four consecutive Cy Young Awards in his first four seasons with the team. In 1999, Arizona won 100 games and their first division championship. In 2001, they won the World Series over the three-time defending champion New York Yankees, becoming the fastest expansion team in major league history to win the World Series, and the only men's major professional sports team in the state of Arizona to win a championship. 

From 1998 to 2022, the Diamondbacks have an overall record of 1,914–2,034.

Franchise history

On March 9, 1995, Phoenix was awarded an expansion franchise to begin play for the  season. A $130 million franchise fee was paid to Major League Baseball and on January 16, 1997, the Diamondbacks were officially voted into the National League. The Diamondbacks' first major league game was played against the Colorado Rockies on March 31, 1998, at Bank One Ballpark. The ballpark was renamed Chase Field in 2005, as a result of Bank One Corporation's merger with JPMorgan Chase & Co.

Since their debut, the Diamondbacks have won five NL West division titles, one NL pennant, one Wild Card game, and the 2001 World Series.

Logos and uniforms

1998–2006

The Diamondbacks' original colors were purple, black, teal and copper. Their first logo was an italicized block letter "A" with a diamond pattern, and the crossbar represented by a snake's tongue. This period saw the Diamondbacks wear various uniform combinations.

At home, the Diamondbacks wore cream uniforms with purple pinstripes. The primary sleeved uniform, worn from 1998 to 2000, featured the full team name ("Diamond" and "Backs" stacked together) in front and chest numbers. The alternate sleeveless version contained the "A" logo on the right chest, and was paired with purple undershirts. Before the 2001 season, the sleeved uniform was changed to feature the "A" logo. In all three uniforms, player names were teal with purple trim, and  numbers were purple with white with teal trim.

The Diamondbacks' primary road gray uniform also contained purple pinstripes. The first version featured "Arizona" in purple with white and teal trim along with black drop shadows. Chest numbers were also added. Player names were in purple with white trim, and numbers were teal with white and purple trim. In 2001, the uniform became sleeveless with black undershirts, and the lettering scheme was changed to purple with white, copper and black accents.

The alternate home purple uniform featured "Arizona" in teal with white and copper trim and black drop shadows. Originally the letters were rendered in teal with copper and white trim, but was changed to copper with teal and white trim after only one season. This set was worn until 2002.

The alternate road black uniform initially featured the "A" logo on the right chest, while letters were in purple with white trim and numbers in teal with white and purple trim. A zigzag pattern of teal, copper and purple was also featured on the sleeves. In 2001, the uniform was changed to feature "Arizona" in front. Letters were now purple with white and copper trim.

The Diamondbacks initially wore four different cap versions. The primary home cap is all-purple, while the road cap is black with a teal brim. They also wore a cream cap with purple brim, and a teal cap with purple brim. All designs featured the primary "A" logo. In 1999, the road cap became all-black and contained the alternate "D-snake" logo rendered in copper. Also, the teal and cream alternate caps were dropped.

The left sleeve of all four uniforms initially contained the snake logo with the full team name, but became only exclusive to the road black uniform after the 2003 season.

2007–2015
The franchise unveiled new uniforms and colors of Sedona red, Sonoran sand and black on November 8, 2006. The red shade is named for the sandstone canyon at Red Rock State Park near Sedona, while the beige (sand) shade is named for the Sonoran Desert. A sleeve patch was added featuring a lowercase "d" and "b" configured to look like a snake's head. The team also kept the "D" logo, which was slightly altered and put on an all-red cap to be used as their game cap. They also kept the "A" logo with the new colors applied to it, with a solid black cap used as the alternate cap. Arizona's updated color scheme bore a striking resemblance to the Houston Astros' then-current color scheme (brick red, sand and black) that the latter used until 2012, as well as the NHL's Phoenix Coyotes, whose adoption of said colors predate the Diamondbacks by four years.

The white home uniform featured "D-Backs" in red with sand and black trim. The road gray uniform featured "Arizona" in red with sand and black trim. Player names were red with black trim while numbers were black with red trim.

The alternate red uniform  contained "D-Backs" in sand with red and black trim, with player names in sand with black trim and numbers in black with sand trim.

There were two versions of the alternate black uniform. One design has the alternate "A" logo on the right chest, while the other has "Arizona" written in red with black and sand trim. The latter was introduced in 2013 as a tribute to the victims of the Yarnell Hill Fire. On both uniforms, player names were sand with red trim, and numbers in red with sand trim.

2016–present

Prior to the 2016 season, the  Diamondbacks reincorporated teal into its color scheme while keeping Sedona Red, Sonoran Sand and black. They also unveiled eight different uniform combinations, including two separate home white and away grey uniforms. One major difference between the two sets is that the non-teal uniforms feature a snakeskin pattern on the shoulders, while the teal-trimmed uniforms include a charcoal/grey snakeskin pattern on the back. Arizona also kept the throwback pinstriped sleeveless uniforms from their 2001 championship season for use during Thursday home games.

Starting with the 2020 season, the Diamondbacks made slight redesigns to their current uniforms. The snakeskin patterns were removed while the teal-trimmed grey uniforms were retired. The team also reverted to a standard grey uniform after wearing a darker shade on the previous set. Two home white uniforms remain in use: the primary Sedona Red and the alternate teal. They would also wear two black uniforms: one with the primary "A" logo on the left chest and the other with "Los D-Backs" trimmed in teal. Three cap designs were also unveiled, all with a black base: the primary "A" cap, the teal-trimmed "snake" cap (paired exclusively on the teal alternates), and the sand-trimmed "snake" cap with red brim (paired exclusively on the Sedona Red alternates). The Nike swoosh logo is also placed on the right chest near the shoulder. In 2022, the Diamondbacks introduced a red "A" cap with black brim.

In 2021, the Diamondbacks were one of seven teams to wear Nike "City Connect" uniforms. The design is primarily sand and has "Serpientes" in black script lettering emblazoned in front. The first "S" in "Serpientes" was shaped to resemble a rattlesnake. The right sleeve has the flag of Arizona patch recolored to the Diamondbacks' current red, sand and black scheme, and the left sleeve has the "A" logo recolored to black and sand. Numerals are in red. The cap is primarily sand with black brim and has the "A" logo in black and sand; the regular batting helmet is used with the uniform. Initially, the Diamondbacks wore white pants with this uniform, but has since switched to sand pants.

Regular season home attendance

Radio and television
The primary television play-by-play voice for the team's first nine seasons of play was Thom Brennaman, who also broadcast baseball and college football games nationally for Fox Television. Brennaman was the TV announcer for the Chicago Cubs and Cincinnati Reds (along with his father Marty Brennaman) before being hired by Diamondbacks founder Jerry Colangelo in 1996, two years before the team would begin play.

In October 2006, Brennaman left the Diamondbacks to call games with his father for the Reds beginning in 2007, signing a four-year deal (his Fox duties remained unchanged).

On November 1, 2006, the team announced that the TV voice of the Milwaukee Brewers since 2002, Daron Sutton, would be hired as the Diamondbacks primary TV play-by-play voice. Sutton was signed to a five-year contract with a team option for three more years. Sutton is considered one of the best of the younger generation of baseball broadcasters. His signature chants include "let's get some runs" when the D-backs trail in late innings. Sutton's father was Hall of Fame pitcher and Atlanta Braves broadcaster Don Sutton.

Former Diamondbacks and Chicago Cubs first baseman Mark Grace and former Major League knuckleball pitcher Tom Candiotti were the Diamondbacks primary color analysts for the 2006 and 2007 seasons. Former Diamondbacks third baseman Matt Williams also did color commentary on occasion, as did former Cardinals and NBC broadcast legend Joe Garagiola, Sr., a longtime Phoenix-area resident and father of Joe Garagiola, Jr., the first GM of the Diamondbacks (as head of the Maricopa County Sports Authority in the early 1990s, Garagiola, Jr. was one of the primary people involved in Phoenix obtaining a Major League Baseball franchise).

The Diamondbacks announced in July 2007 that for the 2008 season, all regionally broadcast Diamondbacks TV games would be shown exclusively on Fox Sports Arizona (now Bally Sports Arizona) and  a few could possibly be shown on the national MLB on Fox telecasts. Bally Sports Arizona is currently seen in 2.8 million households in Arizona and New Mexico. The previous flagship station since the inaugural 1998 season was KTVK (Channel 3), a popular over-the-air independent station (and former longtime ABC affiliate) in Phoenix.

From 2009 to 2012, Mark Grace and Daron Sutton were tagged as the main broadcasters of the Diamondbacks with pre-game and postgame shows on Fox Sports Arizona, being hosted by former big-league closer Joe Borowski.

On June 21, 2012, Daron Sutton was suspended indefinitely, amid rumors of insubordination. Then on August 24, the team announced that Mark Grace had requested an indefinite leave of absence after being arrested for his second DUI in less than two years  (Grace was later indicted on four DUI counts). For the remainder of the 2012 season, Sutton was replaced by Greg Schulte (Jeff Munn replaced Schulte on the radio broadcast) and Grace was replaced by Luis Gonzalez. At the end of the 2012 season, the team announced that neither Sutton nor Grace would be returning for the 2013 season.

On October 18, 2012, the team announced that Bob Brenly would be returning as a broadcaster to replace Grace and that he would be joined by then-ESPN personality Steve Berthiaume.

The English language flagship radio station is KTAR. Greg Schulte is the regular radio play-by-play voice, a 25-year veteran of sports radio in the Phoenix market, also well known for his previous work on Phoenix Suns, Arizona Cardinals and Arizona State University (ASU) broadcasts. He calls games with analyst Tom Candiotti.

Jeff Munn served as a backup radio play-by-play announcer until 2016; he served as the regular public address announcer at Chase Field in the early days of the franchise. He is well known to many Phoenix area sports fans, having also served as the public address announcer for the Suns at what's now Footprint Center in the 1990s. He is also the play-by-play radio voice for ASU women's basketball. Mike Ferrin served in the same role for 6 years before parting ways with the team, and he was replaced by Chris Garagiola in December 2021.

Spanish broadcasts
The flagship Spanish language radio station is KHOV-FM 105.1 with Oscar Soria, Rodrigo López, and Richard Saenz.

Games were televised in Spanish on KPHE-LP—with Oscar Soria and Jerry  Romo as the announcers—but this arrangement ended prior to the 2009 season due to the team switching fully to Fox Sports Arizona and the lack of carriage of KPHE-LP on the Cox cable system.

Achievements

Baseball Hall of Famers

Ford C. Frick Award recipients

Arizona Sports Hall of Fame

All-time leaders

Hitting
Games played: Luis Gonzalez (1999–2006) – 1,194
At bats: Luis Gonzalez – 4,488
Hits: Luis Gonzalez – 1,337
Batting average: Greg Colbrunn – .310
Runs: Luis Gonzalez – 780
Doubles: Luis Gonzalez – 310
Triples: Stephen Drew – 52
Home runs: Luis Gonzalez – 224
Runs batted in: Luis Gonzalez – 774
On-base percentage: Paul Goldschmidt* – .398
Walks: Paul Goldschmidt* – 655
Strikeouts: Paul Goldschmidt* – 1,059
Slugging percentage: Paul Goldschmidt* – .532
Stolen bases: Tony Womack – 182

Pitching
ERA: Randy Johnson (1999–2004, 2007–08) – 2.83
Wins: Randy Johnson – 118
Losses: Randy Johnson/Brandon Webb (2003–10) – 62
Games: Brad Ziegler – 377
Saves: José Valverde – 98
Innings: Randy Johnson – 1630.1
Starts: Randy Johnson – 232
Strikeouts: Randy Johnson – 2,077
Complete games: Randy Johnson – 38
Shutouts: Randy Johnson – 14
WHIP: Curt Schilling – 1.04
 all stats are current as of March 29, 2022 from the Arizona Diamondbacks website.
* signifies current Major League player

Championships

Retired numbers

No. 42 was retired throughout Major League Baseball in 1997 to honor Jackie Robinson.

Season record

Roster

Minor league affiliations

The Arizona Diamondbacks farm system consists of eight minor league affiliates.

See also

 List of Arizona Diamondbacks team records
 List of Arizona Diamondbacks broadcasters
 List of managers and ownership of the Arizona Diamondbacks

References

External links

 

 
Major League Baseball teams
Baseball teams established in 1998
Cactus League
Sports in Phoenix, Arizona
Professional baseball teams in Arizona
1998 establishments in Arizona